María Rosa Menocal (April 9, 1953 - October 15, 2012) was a Cuban-born scholar of medieval culture and history and Sterling Professor of Humanities at Yale University. Menocal earned a B.A., M.A., and Ph.D. from the University of Pennsylvania. Before joining the Yale faculty in 1986, she taught Romance philology at the University of Pennsylvania.

Menocal's 1987 book The Arabic Role in Medieval Literary History challenged the assumption that medieval European culture developed without influence from Arabic and Hebrew literature. This challenge continue throughout her work, and had a lasting impact on the treatment of Arabic texts in medieval literary study. In 2002, Menocal wrote the book The Ornament of the World: How Muslims, Jews and Christians Created a Culture of Tolerance in Medieval Spain, which has been translated into many languages, and includes an introduction by fellow Yale Sterling Professor in the Humanities Harold Bloom. The book focuses on tolerance in Medieval Spain within the Muslim and Christian kingdoms through political examples as well as cultural examples.

Menocal was director of the Yale Whitney Humanities Center for several years and was the co-editor of The Literature of Al-Andalus in the Cambridge History of Arabic Literature series.

She was the mentor of numerous scholars of medieval Iberia, including H. D. Miller, Maria Willstedt, Lourdes Maria Alvarez, Ryan Szpiech, Nadia Altschul, Abigail Balbale, Camilo Gómez-Rivas, Hussein Fancy, and the author Carolina Sanín. She was elected a Fellow of the Medieval Academy of America in 2011 and inducted into the Fellows of the Medieval Academy in March 2012.

Menocal died of melanoma on October 15, 2012.

Publications
The Arabic Role in Medieval Literary History: A Forgotten Heritage (1987, 2004)
Writing in Dante's Cult of Truth: From Borges to Boccacio (1991)
Shards of Love: Exile and the Origins of the Lyric (1994)
Culture in the Time of Tolerance: Al-Andalus as a Model for Our Time (2000)
Co-editor, The Literature of Al-Andalus (2000), Cambridge History of Arabic Literature series
The Ornament of the World: How Muslims, Jews, and Christians Created a Culture of Tolerance in Medieval Spain (2002)
The Arts of Intimacy: Christians, Jews, and Muslims in the Making of Castilian Culture (2008)
The Song of the Cid (Penguin Books), translation by Burton Raffel; introduction and notes by Maria Rosa Menocal (2009)

References

External links
 
The Culture of Translation

1953 births
2012 deaths
Cuban emigrants to the United States
University of Pennsylvania alumni
University of Pennsylvania faculty
Yale University faculty
Yale Sterling Professors
Fellows of the Medieval Academy of America